Odin Glacier is a small glacier that drains the west slopes of Mount Odin in the Asgard Range, Victoria Land. Named by New Zealand Antarctic Place-Names Committee (NZ-APC) in association with Mount Odin. It is separated from Alberich Glacier by Junction Knob.

References

Glaciers of Victoria Land
McMurdo Dry Valleys